Pont-Saint-Martin is a commune in the Loire-Atlantique department in western France.

Etymology
Legend has it that Saint Martin built a bridge over the river Ognon on the territory of the commune.

History
The parish was established in the sixth century by Saint Martin, who was charged with preaching in the region by the bishop of Nantes. It is first mentioned in a bull of Pope Alexander III in 1179. Under the supervision of the monastery of Villenuve and convent of Couëts, 250 hectares were planted in vineyards.

During the Vendéan Wars (1793-1794), the commune lost 18 percent of its population.

Population

Twin towns
It is twinned with the Hampshire village of Brockenhurst in England.

See also
Communes of the Loire-Atlantique department

References

Communes of Loire-Atlantique